Budimir Šegrt (Cyrillic: Будимир Шегрт; born 19 November 1956 in Trebinje) is a Montenegrin doctor, professor and politician who served as the Minister of Health in the Government of Montenegro from 14 March 2015 to 28 November 2016. He is currently serving as the Ambassador of Montenegro to Poland.

On 29 December 2020, the Deputy Prime Minister of Montenegro Dritan Abazović announced that Šegrt was arrested.

References 

Health ministers of Montenegro
Montenegrin politicians 
1956 births
Living people
People from Trebinje
University of Belgrade Faculty of Medicine alumni